Christelle Dabos (born 1980) is a French fantasy author.

Life 
Originally from the Côte d'Azur, Christelle Dabos grew up in Cannes with a family of musicians. She joined the Silver Plume, a community of authors on the Internet. She trained as a librarian before devoting herself to writing. Since 2005, she lives and works in Belgium.

In 2013, she won the Gallimard-RTL-Télérama prize for first youth novel, for A Winter's Promise, the first volume of her Mirror Visitor quartet. The title of the series (La Passe-miroir in French) is inspired by Le Passe-muraille, a literary work by the French writer Marcel Aymé.

The Mirror Visitor quartet narrates the adventures of Ophelia, a heroine with the power to read objects, as well as to move from one place to another through mirrors. The conceit of the setting is that earth has exploded into 21 "arks," like so many planets that make up this fantasy universe. 
In 2017, she published the third installment of the hit saga at Gallimard Jeunesse. 
The series was compared by the national press to that of Harry Potter by J. K. Rowling, or His Dark Materials by Philip Pullman. The first two books were awarded the Grand Prize of the Imaginary in the category francophone youth novel in 2016. Those first two novels were subsequently released in English translation by Europa Editions in 2018 and 2019. The third novel in the series was released in English in 2020. The fourth novel was published in France in November 2019.

Publications

La Passe-miroir (The Mirror Visitor quartet) 
 Les fiancés de l'hiver, Gallimard Jeunesse, Collection Hors Série, 528p, 2013,
 A Winter's Promise, trans. Hildegarde Serle, Europa Editions, 492p, 2018,
 Les disparus du Clairdelune, Gallimard Jeunesse, Collection Romans Ado, 560p, 2015,
 The Missing of Clairdelune, trans. Hildegarde Serle, Europa Editions, 540p, 2019
 La mémoire de Babel, Gallimard Jeunesse, Collection Hors Série, 496p, 2017,
The Memory of Babel, trans. Hildegarde Serle, Europa Editions, 540p, 2020,
 La Tempête des échos, Gallimard Jeunesse, Collection Romans Ado, 576p, 2019
The Storm of Echoes, trans. Hildegarde Serle, Europa Editions, 2021

References

External links 
 Official website of The Mirror Visitor Quartet
 

1980 births
Living people
French women novelists